Daniëlle Esmeralda  Vriezema (born 25 March 1977, in Arnhem) is a Dutch former judoka who competed in the 2000 Summer Olympics.

References

1977 births
Living people
Dutch female judoka
Olympic judoka of the Netherlands
Judoka at the 2000 Summer Olympics
Sportspeople from Arnhem
Universiade medalists in judo
Universiade gold medalists for the Netherlands
Medalists at the 1999 Summer Universiade
20th-century Dutch women
21st-century Dutch women